Milonice may refer to places:

Czech Republic
Milonice (Blansko District), a municipality and village in the South Moravian Region
Milonice (Vyškov District), a municipality and village in the South Moravian Region

Poland
Miłonice, a village in Łódź Voivodeship